Pompoï  is a department or commune of Balé Province in southern Burkina Faso. Its capital lies at the town of Pompoï. According to the 1996 census the department has a total population of 10,613.

Towns and villages
Largest towns and villages and populations in the department are as follows:

 Pompoï	(2 710 inhabitants) (capital)
 Battiti	(522 inhabitants)
 Fegué	(152 inhabitants)
 Kietou	(357 inhabitants)
 Kokoï	(1 027 inhabitants)
 Konkoliko	(1 898 inhabitants)
 Pana	(812 inhabitants)
 Pani	(158 inhabitants)
 Pompoï-gare	(894 inhabitants)
 San	(1 320 inhabitants)
 Sio	(763 inhabitants)

References

Departments of Burkina Faso
Balé Province